The Embassy of Yemen in Washington, D.C. is the Republic of Yemen's diplomatic mission to the United States. It is located at 2319 Wyoming Avenue N.W. in Washington, D.C.'s Kalorama neighborhood.
The current Ambassador is Mohammed Al-Hadhrami.

References

External links

Official website

Yemen
Washington, D.C.
United States–Yemen relations